Ilya Yelizarovich Yelizarov (born January 27, 1963) is a member of the State Duma of Russia.  He is a member of the State Duma's Committee on Economic Policy, Entrepreneurship and Tourism. He is a jurist; before service in the State Duma, Yelizarov was deputy editor-in-chief of the journal Zakon i Pravo ("Law and Order"). 

1963 births
Living people
Fourth convocation members of the State Duma (Russian Federation)
Liberal Democratic Party of Russia politicians
1st class Active State Councillors of the Russian Federation